Big Rapids is a city in the U.S. state of Michigan. The population was 10,601 at the 2010 census. It is the county seat of Mecosta County. The city is located within Big Rapids Township, but it is politically independent. Big Rapids is home of the main campus of Ferris State University, a four-year public university, well known for its College of Pharmacy and the Michigan College of Optometry, as well as its NCAA Division I hockey team, the Bulldogs, and their Division II football and basketball teams.

History
Big Rapids was settled in 1855 by brothers George and Zera French. It became the seat of Mecosta County in 1859. The village was platted in 1859. It was incorporated as a city in 1869.

Geography
Like most of the central Michigan area, it lies on the ancient sea bed and has a sandy subsoil which lies above an iron ore base. The Muskegon River runs through Big Rapids, passing both Ferris State University and the local middle school on its way to Lake Michigan. Numerous small lakes are within a few miles of the city.

Government
The city levies an income tax of 1 percent on residents and 0.5 percent on nonresidents.

Transportation

Major Highways

Bus
Indian Trails provides daily intercity bus service between Grand Rapids and Petoskey, Michigan. The southbound bus stops in Big Rapids at 2:35 pm, and the northbound bus stops in Big Rapids at 6:03 pm. Since August 1, 2014 buses stop in the Save-A-Lot parking lot across the street from the Racquet & Fitness Center.
Public dial-a-ride bus service is provided by the Big Rapids Dial-A-Ride.

Airports
Gerald R. Ford International Airport is the nearest international airport, located roughly one hour south of Big Rapids near Grand Rapids.

Cycling, Hiking
The Fred Meijer White Pine Trail, a  multi-use trail from Grand Rapids to Cadillac, passes through Big Rapids.

Demographics

Population decline 
Big Rapids population peaked in the 1980s. Since the 1980s, Big Rapids has lost over 46% of its population. There are a number of reasons for the decline, one being the decline in enrollment at Ferris State University. Quality of life concerns have also played a role. Mecosta County (like most rural areas) struggles with poor education, lack of high paying jobs, and high rates of substance abuse.

2020 census 
As of the census of 2020, there were 7,727 people, 3,085 households, and 1,044 families living in the city. The racial makeup of the city was 83% White, 5.8% African American, 0.5% Native American, 2.1% Asian, 1.4% from other races, and 7.2% from two or more races. Hispanic or Latino of any race were 5.1% of the population.

There were 3,085 households, of which 22.3% had children under the age of 18 living with them, 21.5% were married couples living together, 10% had a female householder with no husband present, 2.4% had a male householder with no wife present, and 66.2% were non-families. 42.3% of all households were made up of individuals, and 13.5% had someone living alone who was 65 years of age or older. The average household size was 2.09 and the average family size was 2.91.

The median age of the city was 22 years. 12.8% of residents were under the age of 18; 51.2% were between the ages of 18 and 24; 17.6% were from 25 to 44; 10.7% were from 45 to 64; and 7.7% were 65 years of age or older. The gender makeup of the city was 53.7% male and 46.3% female.

2010 census
As of the census of 2010, there were 10,601 people, 3,330 households, and 1,323 families living in the city. The racial makeup of the city was 88.0% White, 6.8% African American, 0.7% Native American, 1.5% Asian, 0.6% from other races, and 2.5% from two or more races. Hispanic or Latino of any race were 2.4% of the population.

There were 3,330 households, of which 22.2% had children under the age of 18 living with them, 22.9% were married couples living together, 12.7% had a female householder with no husband present, 4.2% had a male householder with no wife present, and 60.3% were non-families. 36.5% of all households were made up of individuals, and 9.8% had someone living alone who was 65 years of age or older. The average household size was 2.22 and the average family size was 2.88.

The median age in the city was 21.8 years. 12.5% of residents were under the age of 18; 54% were between the ages of 18 and 24; 15.9% were from 25 to 44; 11.2% were from 45 to 64; and 6.5% were 65 years of age or older. The gender makeup of the city was 51.0% male and 49.0% female.

2000 census
As of the census of 2000, there were 10,849 people, 3,388 households, and 1,473 families living in the city. The racial makeup of the city was 83.57% White, 10.63% Black, 0.73% Native American, 2.24% Asian, 0.04% Pacific Islander, 0.50% from other races, and 2.30% from two or more races. Hispanic or Latino of any race were 1.83% of the population.

There were 3,388 households, out of which 25.5% had children under the age of 18 living with them, 26.5% were married couples living together, 14.3% had a female householder with no husband present, and 56.5% were non-families. 35.7% of all households were made up of individuals, and 9.8% had someone living alone who was 65 years of age or older. The average household size was 2.26 and the average family size was 2.93.

In the city, the population was spread out, with 15.2% under the age of 18, 51.0% from 18 to 24, 17.3% from 25 to 44, 9.1% from 45 to 64, and 7.4% who were 65 years of age or older. The median age was 22 years. For every 100 females, there were 109.4 males. For every 100 females age 18 and over, there were 110.4 males. Ferris State University has a high number of male students, accounting for this anomaly.

The median income for a household in the city was $20,192, and the median income for a family was $28,629. Males had a median income of $30,341 versus $19,770 for females. The per capita income for the city was $10,719. About 19.2% of families and 35.0% of the population were below the poverty line, including 29.3% of those under age 18 and 11.6% of those age 65 or over.

Climate
This climatic region has large seasonal temperature differences, with warm to hot (and often humid) summers and cold (sometimes severely cold) winters. According to the Köppen Climate Classification system, Big Rapids has a humid continental climate, abbreviated "Dfb" on climate maps.

Notable people

 Matt Borland, NASCAR crew chief
  Justin Currie, NFL player; raised in Big Rapids 
 May Erlewine, a musician from Big Rapids
 Ben Hebard Fuller, Major General and Commandant of the Marine Corps; born in Big Rapids
 Clint Hurdle, outfielder with four MLB teams; manager of the Colorado Rockies and Pittsburgh Pirates; born in Big Rapids
 James Hynes, novelist; grew up in Big Rapids
 Tom Shanahan, a sportswriter and author; grew up in Big Rapids.
 Anna Howard Shaw, a leader of the women's suffrage movement in the nineteenth century; lived in Big Rapids as a young woman
 Daisy Tapley, an African American classical singer; born in Big Rapids

Education
 Big Rapids Public Schools
 Crossroads Charter Academy
 Ferris State University
 St. Peter's Lutheran Church and School
 St. Mary's Catholic School

References

External links

Big Rapids official website
Big Rapids Convention & Visitors Bureau

1855 establishments in Michigan
Populated places established in 1855
Cities in Mecosta County, Michigan
County seats in Michigan
Micropolitan areas of Michigan